The 2013 AFC U-19 Women's Championship took place in 11–20 October 2013.

Australia
Coach:  Spencer Prior

The final squad was named on 27 September 2013.

China
Coach: Wang Jun

Myanmar
Coach:  Radov Minkovski

North Korea
Coach: Hwang Yong-bong

Japan
Coach: Hiroshi Yoshida

The final squad was named on 26 September 2013.

South Korea
Coach: Jong Song-chon

The final squad was named on 1 October 2013.

References

2013 AFC U-19 Women's Championship
2013 in youth sport